Justice Harish Chandra Mishra (born 27 March 1959) is an Indian judge currently serving as the Lokayukta of Delhi. He is former Judge of Jharkhand High Court. He has also served as Acting Chief Justice of Jharkhand High Court.

Reference 

Indian judges
Living people
1959 births